Alexander Uspensky may refer to:

 Alexander Uspenski (born 1987), Russian figure skater
 Alexander Ivanovich Uspensky (1902–1940), leader of the Cheka, the GPU and the NKVD